Lucien Trepper (born 19 May 1953) is a Swiss archer. He competed in the men's individual event at the 1972 Summer Olympics.

References

1953 births
Living people
Swiss male archers
Olympic archers of Switzerland
Archers at the 1972 Summer Olympics
Place of birth missing (living people)